Yohann Boulic (born May 5, 1978 in Brest) is a French professional footballer. He currently plays in the Championnat de France amateur 2 for Quimper Cornouaille FC.

He played on the professional level in Ligue 2 for Stade Brestois 29.

Club 
Boulic played one game for US Concarneau. The game, against FC Red Star Saint-Ouen, finished in a 2-0 win for the Paris-based side.

International 

He was called up for the Brittany national football team, a team that is not affiliated to FIFA nor UEFA nor the NF-Board in May 2008 for a friendly game against Congo at Stade Fred Aubert in Saint-Brieuc. The game 3–1 to the French side.

Statistics 

Updated 2 May 2010

See also 
Football in France
List of football clubs in France

References 

1978 births
Living people
French footballers
Quimper Kerfeunteun F.C. players
Ligue 2 players
Stade Brestois 29 players
US Concarneau players
Association football goalkeepers
Sportspeople from Brest, France
Footballers from Brittany